The 1925 Waterbury-Hartford Blues season was their second season in existence and their last independent season before joining the National Football League in 1926. The team finished the season with a 10–2 record. The team also relocated to Hartford from Waterbury midway through the season. With the change in venue, the team was renamed the Hartford Blues.

Schedule

References

Hartford Blues seasons